Zürcher Murren, also called pain bernois, Bernerweggen, Spitzweggen, geschnittene Weggli or Zackenweggen are a type of bread roll traditionally made in the German-speaking part of Switzerland and, more rarely, in the Romandy.

History and name
The first recorded mention of the Murren is found in a document in the Zürich State Archives from 1508. Detailed descriptions of the pastry are found in late 19th-century sources and match the contemporary appearance of the Murren closely. Research by Swiss food historians indicates that the Murren were a specialty of Zürich's bakers up until the 20th century, at which time they became popular in other parts of Switzerland, with the exception of Ticino where they are almost unknown. Up until late into the 20th century, Murren were a treat for feasts, as white flour was too expensive for everyday consumption by most people.

While the breadroll is known as Zürcher Murren (or Zürimurre in the local dialect) in the canton of Zürich, it is referred to as Berner Weggli or Weggen ("Bernese breadrolls") in the canton of Berne and in the Romandie, and under generic terms such as Spitzweggen ("pointy breadrolls") elsewhere in Switzerland. The etymology of the word Murren is unclear. It may be derived from Middle High German murr ("blunt"), from Spanish or Portuguese morro ("round") or from Dutch murw ("brittle").

Production
Like the Weggli, another traditional Swiss breadroll, Murren are made of white flour, milk, butter, yeast, a pinch of salt and sugar, malt and a leavening agent. These ingredients yield a stringy, elastic dough that is allowed to rise for 30 minutes, before it is mechanically divided into small pieces.

The pieces are again allowed to rise for half an hour in a heated closet, and are then superficially sliced with a special tool to produce five cuts that result in the Murrens characteristic points after baking.

Consumption and significance
Murren are best when freshly baked, as the dough is quick to dry out. They are traditionally eaten at breakfast with jam, honey or butter; or as a snack with a chocolate branche. The five spikes are the Murren'''s hardest part and may hurt the palate of incautious eaters.

Commercially, Murren are less significant than the similar and more  popular Weggli'', although they are generally available in bakeries and supermarkets across northern and central Switzerland.

References

Bibliography 
 Schweizer Bäckerei, Richemont Fachschule, Luzern, 2006.
 1954, Nr. 4., Fachschule Richemont Luzern, ab 1945.

See also 
 Culinary Heritage of Switzerland

Culinary Heritage of Switzerland
Swiss breads